Aluminium Bahrain B.S.C. (Alba) is the first aluminium smelter in the Middle East which started its commercial operations in 1971.

84% of Alba's employees are Bahraini nationals  and the company has introduced numerous capacity building initiatives to boost nationalisation of its workforce.

History
Alba’s inception marked the beginning of Bahrain’s strategy to diversify its economy and reduce its dependence on oil. Its early success established a blueprint for other non-oil industries to follow, including a thriving downstream aluminium industry. Alba was officially incorporated in 1968 and began operations in 1971 with an annual capacity of 120,000 metric tonnes per year. After modernisation and expansion works the smelter's capacity rose to 450,000 tonnes in 1992. In March 2005, Alba commissioned a new reduction line, Line 5, which increased the company's capacity to over 860,000 tonnes of aluminium at that time. Today, thanks to its newly inaugurated Line 6, Alba's production capacity is beyond 1.5M mtpa.

Ownership
The shareholders of Alba are Bahrain Mumtalakat Holding Company (69.38%), SABIC Investment Company (20.62%) and the General Public (10%).

The company went public in 2010, launched its first IPO, and was listed on the Bahrain Bourse and the London Stock Exchange, under the symbol "ALBH".

Plant
The Alba plant comprises six reduction lines, four casthouses, four carbon plants, a petroleum coke calciner and seawater desalination Plant, 12 fume treatment plants, a marine terminal, and three power stations. The plant also features a 13-hectare oasis, with more than 15,000 trees and shrubs and an artificial lake.

Product range

Aluminium products

10KG and 22.5KG standard ingots 
The standard ingots – known for their high purity – are manufactured using state-of-the-art technology process that succeeds in meeting the most stringent quality requirements. Alba's standard ingots (10 kg and 22.5 kg) are ideal for downstream users which are re-melted in their own furnaces, then cast to produce a variety of end products, covering the entire spectrum of aluminium applications.

Rolling ingots (slabs) 
High-quality rolling ingots (slabs) are used in rolling mills for manufacturing aluminium foil and sheet products, amongst many other end-applications including manufacturing automotive products and aluminium beverage cans.

Properzi bars (foundry alloys) 
Alba's Properzi bars (foundry alloys) are produced using state-of-the-art casting and metal treatment systems exceeding the most stringent of quality requirements.

When it comes to car safety, only the highest quality and most reliable materials are chosen by auto manufacturers. That is why alloy wheels made from Foundry Alloys are preferred for being lighter while boasting the same strength as steel wheels as well as for providing better heat conduction that can help dissipate heat from brakes.

Extrusion ingots (billets) 
Alba's extrusion ingot is supplied in cut-to-length billet form ranging from 400 mm long to a length of up to 8,500 mm, and are widely used in the construction industry for windows and door frames, transportation, engineering, and consumer durables.

LME sows 
P1020 and higher-grade LME sows are conforming to London Metal Exchange standards and are used in many re-melting and casting applications including fabrication into various end-products such as pressure cookers and the facades of skyscrapers.

T-Ingots 
Alba's i-ingots are available in both P1020 form and in foundry alloys. T-ingots in foundry alloys are produced by using state-of-the-art casting and metal treatment systems, exceeding the most stringent of quality requirements.

Liquid metal 
Alba produces high-quality molten aluminium with an average purity exceeding 99.88%. Alba's major customers for molten aluminium include Midal Cables, Bahrain Alloys Manufacturing Company (BAMCO), Bahrain Welding Wire Products Mfg. Co. (BWP), and Bahrain Atomisers International (BAI).

Other products

Calcined coke 
Alba is one of only two smelters in the world to have a dedicated coke calciner, its production capacity is nearly 550,000 metric tonnes per annum. Calcined Petroleum Coke (CPC) is the major raw material used to produce carbon anodes for the aluminium smelting process, while the raw coke  the Green Petroleum Coke (GPC)  is the product of the coker unit in a crude oil refinery and must possess sufficiently low metal content in order to be used as anode material.

Power 
With its three natural gas turbine power stations having a total power generating capacity of 3,665 MW ISO, equivalent to the average power consumed in Bahrain as a whole, Alba's energy needs are fulfilled independently.

Water 
Alba's seawater desalination plant was commissioned in 2001. It utilises waste heat from the calcining process to generate steam for the production and supply of 41,000 cubic metres per day of potable water.

Alba's potable water is sold to Bahrain's Electricity & Water Authority for general consumption in the Kingdom, and utilised for a variety of uses in and around the company, including irrigating Her Royal Highness Princess Sabeeka Oasis.

Environment conservation

Alba has invested hundreds of millions  in environmental conservation and earned international praise and recognition for being committed to implementing the highest environmental standards across the organisation. Alba's site is ISO14001:2015 certified and Alba campus has been the recipient of Aluminium Stewardship Initiative (ASI) Performance Standards since January 2020.

Gallery

References

Aluminium companies of Bahrain
Aluminium smelters
Manufacturing companies established in 1968
Companies listed on the Bahrain Bourse
Companies listed on the London Stock Exchange
Bahraini companies established in 1968